"The Secret Life of Bots" is a 2017 science fiction story by Suzanne Palmer. It was first published in Clarkesworld.

Synopsis

Autonomous maintenance robots take on a much larger role in saving a spaceship from aliens than the ship's human crew could have ever suspected.

Reception
"The Secret Life of Bots" won the 2018 Hugo Award for Best Novelette Tangent Online considered it to be "charming", with "vivid, interesting characters", and noted the robots have "individuality and multitudes of personalities".

References

External links
Text of the story

Works originally published in Clarkesworld Magazine
Hugo Award for Best Novelette winning works